Christian Daigle (1 February 1978 – 29 January 2021) was a certified NHL Player Agent and the president at Momentum Hockey. He worked with Momentum's clients and their families for over fifteen years.

Daigle was born in Saint-Hubert, Quebec. He played in the Quebec Major Junior Hockey League (QMJHL) for four years, most notably with the Val-d'Or Foreurs in his final two seasons. While with the Foreurs, he helped his team make it to the Memorial Cup Tournament in the 1997-98 season, and he was named captain the following year. Following his career in the QMJHL, he completed his undergraduate studies at HEC Montréal.

Career statistics

References

1978 births
2021 deaths
Canadian sports agents
HEC Montréal alumni
Ice hockey people from Ottawa
Val-d'Or Foreurs players